A prikaz (prikaz; ,) was an administrative, judicial, territorial, or executive office functioning on behalf of palace, civil, military, or church authorities in Muscovy and in Russia from the 15th to the 18th centuries. The term usually suggests the functionality of a modern "ministry", "office" or "department". In modern Russian, prikaz literally means an "order".

Most of the prikazes were subordinated to the Boyar Duma. Some of them (palace prikazes were subordinated to the taynyi prikaz or pervyi prikaz, which answered directly to the tsar. The patriarch of Moscow and All Russia had his own prikazes.

History
Originally, prikazes were created by private orders (prikaz) given by the tsar to a certain person. The functions of the prikazy would be led by boyars and professional administrators. From 1512, the term "Prikaz" started to be used to refer to offices. There were 22 prikazy (departments) in 1613, however this number would balloon to 80 by the mid-17th century.

Abolition 
The prikazes were abolished by Peter the Great and replaced, beginning in 1717, with administrative organs known as collegiate.

This process would undergo a long span of time; the Siberian Prikaz, for example, was restored in 1730 and existed until 1755. At the beginning of the 18th century, Peter the Great even established some new prikazes. The system was only fully eliminated by Catherine the Great in 1775.

List of Russian prikazes

Foreign affairs
Ambassadorial Prikaz - in charge of international affairs, a kind of a Ministry of Foreign Affairs, 1549-1718
Captive Prikaz, (Polonyanichy Prikaz from archaic  'polon', 'plen' meaning "captive"), for the redemption of Russian captives and prisoners of war
Prikaz of Pans (Panskiy Prikaz) - office of Polish affairs
Administrative
Prikaz of the Seal (Pechatny Prikaz) - placed the tsar's seal on various documents granting various things to private individuals, and collected the corresponding duties
Stone Prikaz (Kamennyi Prikaz)
Coachman Prikaz (Courier Prikaz, Yam Prikaz: Yamskoy Prikaz)
Book Printing Prikaz
Prikaz of Hospice Construction
Pharmaceutical Prikaz (Aptekarskiy prikaz)
Monk Prikaz (Monasheskiy Prikaz)
Judicial Prikazes 
Moscow
Vladimir
Dmitrov
Ryazan
Military Prikazes 
Prikaz of Riflemen (Streletsky Prikaz)
Artillery Prikaz , (Pushkarsky Prikaz)
Prikaz of Admiralty, (Admiralteysky Prikaz)
Prikaz of Cossacks, 1618-1646
Armored Prikaz (Bronniy Prikaz)
Conscription Prikaz (Prikaz sbora ratnykh i datochnykh lydei
Prikaz of Foreign Lands (Inozemsky Prikaz)
Arsenal Prikaz (Oruzheiniy Prikaz)
 Preobrazhensky prikaz (ru), which oversaw the Preobrazhensky and Semyonovsky regiments in the 18th century
Prikaz of German feeds: probably, paid a salary to foreigners (known as "Germans" ( 'niemtsy' means "mute people")) in Russian military or state service
Ritter Prikaz 
Financial Prikazes 
Domestic Prikaz (Pomestny Prikaz)
Accounting Prikaz 
Prikaz of Grand Treasury
Prikaz of Grand Income
Security
Prikaz of Petitions (Chelobitny Prikaz) - considered complaints or petitions addressed to the Tsar; the adjective chelobitnaya comes from the expression bit' chelom, "to knock with one's forehead (on the ground)", meaning a very humble submission of a petition, with an extremely low bow. The standard form of such complaint included the words "Slave of God ... (or: 'Your slave') is beating with the forehead", or "Slaves and orphans are beating with foreheads"
Privy Prikaz (Tayny Prikaz) - secret police (1654 - 1676)
Robbery Prikaz (Razboiniy Prikas) - criminal police
Prikaz of Investigations (Sysknoy prikaz)
Regional Prikazes 
Little Russia, Ministry of the Ukrainian (Malorossiya) Affairs (Малороссийский приказ, Malorossiyskiy prikaz)
Kazan (Казанский приказ, Приказ Казанского дворца, Kazan Palace Prikaz ), Volga Region (Поволжье) Affairs (South-West of Russia, territories of former Kazan Khanate)
Siberia, (1637-1763)
Great Russia
Grand Duchy of Lithuania
Smolensk (disbanded on Poland's conquest of Smolensk (1611); restored when Smolensk returned to Russian control in 1654)
Livonia Affairs
Novgorod quarter
Vladimir quarter
Ustyug quarter
Kostroma quarter
Galich quarter
Smolensk quarter
Palace Prikazes 
Prikaz of Stables Konyushenny Prikaz 
Palace Prikaz (1627-1709)
Prikaz of Stone Palace (Prikaz kamennogo dvortsa)
Prikaz of Gold and Silver Affairs
Prikaz of Requiem (Panihydniy prikaz) - requiems for members of the tsar's family
Patriarchal Prikazes 
Patriarchal Prikaz-in-charge
Patriarchal Treasury Prikaz 
Patriarchal Palace Prikaz 
Other
Order-in-charge (Razryadny Prikaz) - in charge of higher military and civil administration personnel
Prikaz of kholops (Kholopskiy Prikaz) - considered the affairs of kholops

Classification
The classification of the various prikazes is a very difficult task. In fact, each major historian tries to build their own system of classification. Major variants include prikazes of a territory, of a class of population, or of an area of affairs. Another method of classification is to rank prikazes by subordination.

See also
Dyak, clerk
Podyachy, clerk assistant
List of Russian foreign ministers

References

External links
State administration in Russia 16th-17th centuries, in Russian

Tsardom of Russia
Government of the Russian Empire
Medieval Russia